Mandia peja is a type of Indian soup made up of mandia (ragi) and rice. This soup is the major food of Adivasis or tribals living in Southern Orissa (Korput, Rayagada, Nabarangpur and Malkangiri) and its adjacent areas of Chhattisgarh and Andhra Pradesh.

See also
 List of soups

References

Indian soups and stews